The East Fremantle Football Club is the third most successful Australian Rules Football Club in Australia, having won a total of 29 West Australian Football League premierships (in the South Australian National Football League, Port Adelaide has won 35 premierships and Norwood has won 30). East Fremantle won their first premiership in 1900 but Grand Finals were not played in the West Australian Football Association until 1904. East Fremantle's last premiership was won in 1998.

League premiership teams

1908
East Fremantle 5.7 (37) d. Perth 0.8 (8)

1909
East Fremantle 8.8 (56) d. Perth 4.6 (30)

1910
East Fremantle 5.5 (35) d. Perth 2.10 (22)

1911
East Fremantle 14.12 (96) d. West Perth 7.3 (45)

1914
East Fremantle 5.13 (43) d. South Fremantle 3.6 (24)

1918
East Fremantle 11.8 (74) d. East Perth 8.5 (53)

1925
East Fremantle 10.10 (70) d. Subiaco 6.7 (43)

1928
East Fremantle 10.13 (73) d. East Perth 8.8 (56)

1929
East Fremantle 8.22 (70) d. South Fremantle 5.9 (39)

1930
East Fremantle 12.15 (87) d. South Fremantle 9.11 (65)

1931
East Fremantle 9.13 (67) d. Subiaco 7.7 (49)

1933
East Fremantle 10.13 (73) d. Subiaco 7.7 (49)

1937
East Fremantle 14.13 (97) d. Claremont 13.9 (87)

1943*
East Fremantle 17.15 (117) d. Swan Districts 11.11 (77)

Team: Bathurst, Bourke, Clark, Cole, Conway (c), Cumbers, Gabrielson, Hinkley, Jarvis, Johanson, Mason, Murray, Ralph, Richardson, Sheedy, Smith, Teague, Travers

Reserve: Robertson

Coach: J. Dolan

* The 1943 season was an under-19 competition due to World War II

1945
East Fremantle 12.15 (87) d. South Fremantle 7.9 (51)

1946
East Fremantle 11.13 (79) d. West Perth 10.13 (73)

1957
East Fremantle 10.18 (78) d. East Perth 9.8 (62)

1965
East Fremantle 18.18 (126) d. Swan Districts 16.6 (102)

1974
East Fremantle 17.20 (122) d. Perth 15.10 (100)

1979
East Fremantle 21.19 (145) d. South Fremantle 16.6 (102)

1985
East Fremantle 15.12 (102) d. Subiaco 14.13 (97)

1992
East Fremantle 12.19 (91) d. South Fremantle 9.13 (67)

1994
East Fremantle 13.13 (91) d. Claremont 10.10 (70)

1998
East Fremantle 20.10 (130) d. West Perth 13.9 (87)

References

EFFC list
 1931-1979: 
 1992-1994: 

East Fremantle Football Club
Australian rules football-related lists
Fremantle-related lists